33rd was a station on the Chicago Transit Authority's South Side Main Line, which is now part of the Green Line. The station was located at 33rd Street and Wabash Avenue in the Douglas neighborhood of Chicago. 33rd was situated south of 31st and north of Tech–35th, which is now named 35th–Bronzeville–IIT. 33rd opened on June 6, 1892, and closed on August 1, 1949. Portions of the station remained in service as part of Tech–35th until September 25, 1961.

References

Defunct Chicago "L" stations
Railway stations in the United States opened in 1892
Railway stations closed in 1961
1892 establishments in Illinois
1961 disestablishments in Illinois
Railway stations in Chicago